The Gothenburg Symphony Orchestra (GSO) is a Swedish symphony orchestra based in Gothenburg.  The GSO is resident at the Gothenburg Concert Hall at Götaplatsen.  The orchestra received the title of the National Orchestra of Sweden in 1997.

Background and history
The GSO was founded in 1905, with Heinrich Hammer as its first principal conductor.  The composer Wilhelm Stenhammar was the orchestra's second principal conductor, from 1907 to 1922.  In addition to Stenhammar conducting his own works, Jean Sibelius and Carl Nielsen made regular guest-conducting appearances with the GSO.  The orchestra's fortunes waxed and waned in subsequent years, until the advent of Neeme Järvi as principal conductor, from 1982 to 2004.  Although the GSO has a broad repertoire, it has a special affinity for the works of the Nordic Late Romantic composers, such as Jean Sibelius and Edvard Grieg.  During Järvi's tenure as principal conductor, the longest tenure of any principal conductor in the GSO's history, its reputation on the world stage was greatly increased, including sponsorships from Volvo and a recording contract with Deutsche Grammophon.  Järvi currently holds the title of Principal Conductor Emeritus (Chefdirigent Emeritus) with the GSO.

Gustavo Dudamel was principal conductor of the GSO from 2007 to 2012, and now has the title of hedersdirigent (honorary conductor) of the GSO.  Past principal guest conductors of the GSO have included Norman del Mar, who was Permanent Guest Conductor from 1968 to 1973, and Christian Zacharias.  Kent Nagano became principal guest conductor and artistic advisor of the GSO as of the 2013–2014 season, with an initial contract of three years.  In August 2014, Santtu-Matias Rouvali first guest-conducted the GSO.  In May 2016, the GSO announced the  appointment of Rouvali as its next chief conductor, effective with the 2017–2018 season, with an initial contract of four years.  In May 2019, the GSO announced the extension of Rouvali's contract through 2025.

In addition to Deutsche Grammophon, the orchestra has recorded commercially for such labels as BIS.

Principal Conductors
 Heinrich Hammer (1905–1907)
 Wilhelm Stenhammar (1907–1922)
 Ture Rangström (1922–1925)
 Tor Mann (1925–1939)
 Issay Dobrowen (1941–1953)
 Dean Dixon (1953–1960)
 Sten Frykberg (1960–1967)
 Sergiu Comissiona (1967–1973)
 Sixten Ehrling (1974–1976)
 Charles Dutoit (1976–1979)
 Neeme Järvi (1982–2004)
 Mario Venzago (2004–2007)
 Gustavo Dudamel (2007–2012)
 Santtu-Matias Rouvali (2017–present)

Premieres
Hilding Hallnäs symphonies Nos. 1 (1945), 2 (1948), 3 (1948), 4 (1952), and 5 (1963), Gösta Nystroem symphonies 1 (1932), 2 (1937), and 4 (1952), Wilhelm Peterson-Berger Symphony No.2 (1911), Allan Pettersson symphonies Nos. 3 (1956), 9 (1971), Hilding Rosenberg Tre Fantasistycken (1919), Symphony 1 (1921), Piano Concerto (1951), and Eduard Tubin Symphony No.11. (1989).

See also
Music of Sweden
Gothenburg Opera

References

Sources

External links
Gothenburg Symphony Orchestra official website

Symphony
Musical groups established in 1905
Organizations based in Gothenburg
1905 establishments in Sweden
Swedish symphony orchestras
National orchestras
Deutsche Grammophon artists
Arts organizations established in 1905